Filip Osman (Serbian Cyrillic: Филип Осман; born 21 December 1991) is a Serbian football midfielder who plays for Dinamo Pančevo.

External links
 Profile at Srbijafudbal
 

1991 births
Living people
Footballers from Belgrade
Serbian footballers
Association football midfielders
Serbian expatriate footballers
FK Voždovac players
FK Radnički 1923 players
FK Slavija Sarajevo players
FK Smederevo players
FK BASK players
FK Bežanija players
FK Budućnost Dobanovci players
FK Sinđelić Beograd players
FK Kolubara players
FK Sileks players
FK Dinamo Pančevo players
Serbian First League players
Serbian SuperLiga players
Premier League of Bosnia and Herzegovina players
Macedonian First Football League players
Serbian expatriate sportspeople in Bosnia and Herzegovina
Serbian expatriate sportspeople in North Macedonia
Expatriate footballers in Bosnia and Herzegovina
Expatriate footballers in North Macedonia